Ellen Feldman (born 1941) is an American writer. She grew up in New Jersey and attended Bryn Mawr College, and graduated with B.A. and an M.A. in modern history. She also worked for a publishing firm in New York City and continued with graduate studies at Columbia University.

Feldman currently lives in New York City and East Hampton, New York.

Works

 A.K.A. Katherine Walden (1982)
 Conjugal Rites (1986), Elizabeth Villars
 Looking for Love (1990), Elizabeth Villars
 Too Close for Comfort (1994), Elizabeth Villars
 Rearview Mirror (1995)
 God Bless the Child (1998)
 Lucy (2003)
 The Boy Who Loved Anne Frank (2005)
 Scottsboro (2008)
 Next to Love (2011)
 The Unwitting (2014)
 Terrible Virtue (2016)
 Paris Never Leaves You (2020)
 The Living and the Lost (2021)

She has also written under the pseudonym Amanda Russell.

Lucy
Lucy (2003), was about Franklin Roosevelt's love for Lucy Mercer, who was the social secretary of Eleanor Roosevelt, his wife.

Scottsboro
Scottsboro was a 2009 novel about the Scottsboro Boys, nine black youths controversially accused of rape. Lionel Shriver in The Telegraph (UK) found it "a pleasure to read" despite the horrors it described.  It was shortlisted for the Orange Prize for Fiction in 2009.

Next to Love
Her novel Next to Love (2011), tells the story of three Massachusetts women from the 1940s to 1960s. It was inspired by the true story of the Bedford Boys, a group of men from around Bedford, Virginia, many of whom were killed in the first few minutes of the D-Day landings.

References

Living people
21st-century American novelists
American women novelists
21st-century American women writers
Bryn Mawr College alumni
1941 births